Dungeon Crawl Classics (DCC) is a series of tabletop role-playing game modules published by Goodman Games. The modules have been published for the third and fourth editions of Dungeons & Dragons and for the Dungeon Crawl Classics Role-Playing Game (DCC RPG). Some of the modules have been ported to the first edition of Advanced Dungeons & Dragons as well as Castles & Crusades.

The modules presented here are in separate lists based on the game or edition for which the adventure was published.

Dungeons & Dragons 3rd edition

Dungeons & Dragons 4th edition

Dungeon Crawl Classics Role Playing Game

Dungeon Crawl Classics Lankhmar 
These adventures were released for use with the Lankhmar campaign setting, for the Dungeon Crawl Classics role-playing game.  Authorized by the estate of Fritz Leiber.

Dungeon Crawl Classics Empire of the East 
These adventures are based in the Empire of the East setting, officially licensed by the estate of Fred Saberhagen.

Dungeon Crawl Classics Horror 
A line of horror themed adventures, for the Dungeon Crawl Classics role-playing game.  Includes new adventures, and reprints of previous Halloween modules.

Holiday Modules 
A line of holiday-themed adventures, for the Dungeon Crawl Classics role-playing game.

Convention Modules 
Modules designed for convention play, in shorter time slots.

Road Crew Modules

Free RPG Day Modules

DCC Day Modules 
Modules released annually during Goodman Games' "DCC Day" event.

Program Guides & Yearbooks

Other Rules Sets

Advanced Dungeons & Dragons 1st edition 
These adventures were in most cases released as 3rd edition modules and were ported to the 1st edition as special releases for Gen Con.

Castles & Crusades 
Goodman Games has produced, under license, several adventure modules for Castles & Crusades by Troll Lord Games. In most cases these are 3rd edition modules which were ported to the new rules system.

Mutant Crawl Classics 
These adventures were released for use with the post-apocalyptic Mutant Crawl Classics RPG, which is 100% compatible with Dungeon Crawl Classics RPG.

X-Crawl Classics 
These adventures were released for use with the X-Crawl Classics RPG, which is 100% compatible with Dungeon Crawl Classics RPG.

References

External links
Dungeon Crawl Classics product page

American role-playing games
D20 System adventures